Tomás Bettaglio (born 23 September 1991) is an Argentine field hockey player for who plays as a forward for Banco Provincia and the Argentine national team.

He represented Argentina at the 2018 Men's Hockey World Cup.

References

External links

1991 births
Living people
Argentine male field hockey players
Male field hockey forwards
Field hockey players from Buenos Aires
Competitors at the 2018 South American Games
2018 Men's Hockey World Cup players
South American Games gold medalists for Argentina
South American Games medalists in field hockey
20th-century Argentine people
21st-century Argentine people